Otto Fahr (August 19, 1892 – February 28, 1969) was a German backstroke swimmer, who competed in the 1912 Summer Olympics. He was born and died in Bad Cannstatt. Fahr participated in only one event and won the silver medal in the 100 metre backstroke competition.

References

External links
profile

1892 births
1969 deaths
Male backstroke swimmers
German male swimmers
Olympic swimmers of Germany
Swimmers at the 1912 Summer Olympics
Olympic silver medalists for Germany
World record setters in swimming
Medalists at the 1912 Summer Olympics
Knights Commander of the Order of Merit of the Federal Republic of Germany
Olympic silver medalists in swimming
Nazi Party members